Lois "Elle" Johnson is an American television writer, producer, and showrunner.

Early life and education
Johnson grew up in Hollis, Queens in New York City. Her father was a parole officer and her uncle was a homicide detective. In 1981, her 16-year-old cousin was killed in a botched robbery at a Burger King in the Bronx.

Johnson graduated from Harvard University in 1986 with an AB in art history.

Career
Given her family's background in law enforcement, Johnson's career as a writer and producer in television has centered around police procedurals and other police crime dramas, including Homicide: Life on the Street, CSI: Miami, Street Time, Law & Order, The Glades, and Bosch. Other shows she has worked on include Rescue 77, Any Day Now, Ghost Whisperer, and The Fosters.

Johnson was an executive producer and co-showrunner for the 2020 Netflix miniseries Self Made: Inspired by the Life of Madam C. J. Walker.

Writings
Johnson is the author of the memoir The Officer's Daughter, published by HarperCollins in 2021. The book focuses on the murder of her cousin and her relationship with her father.

References

External links
 

Year of birth missing (living people)
Living people
American women television producers
American television writers
American women television writers
African-American women writers
People from Hollis, Queens
Showrunners
Harvard College alumni
African-American screenwriters
21st-century African-American people
21st-century African-American women